Acidava (Acidaua) was a Dacian and later Roman fortress on the Olt river near the lower Danube. The settlements remains are located in today's Enoşeşti, Olt County, Oltenia, Romania.

History 
After the Roman conquest of Dacia by Roman Emperor Trajan, Acidava became a civilian and military center, with castra being built in the area. Acidava was part of the Limes Alutanus, a line of fortifications built under emperor Hadrian running north–south along the Alutus – the Olt river. The function of the lines was to monitor the Roxolani to the east and deter any possible attacks.

Acidava is depicted in the Tabula Peutingeriana between Romula and Rusidava.
The same document depicts a second Acidava, between Cedoniae and Apula, but some authors believe it is actually a copy error and the correct name is Sacidava, another Dacian town.

See also 
 Acidava (castra)
 Dacia
 Roman Dacia
 List of ancient cities in Thrace and Dacia
 Dacian davae

Notes

References

External links 

 Archaeological sites around Enoşeşti on the Mapserver for Romanian National Cultural Heritage
 Many items recovered from Acidava are available at the Olt County Museum, Romania
 Acidava in the Princeton Encyclopedia of Classical Sites
 Acidava in the Dictionary of Greek and Roman Geography (1854)
 Sorin Olteanu's Project: Linguae Thraco-Daco-Moesorum – Toponyms Section
 A street in Bucharest, having the ancient city name: Strada Acidava

Dacian towns
Archaeological sites in Romania
Ruins in Romania
Former populated places in Romania
Roman legionary fortresses in Romania
History of Oltenia